İzmirspor is а Turkish football club based in İzmir, Turkey. They were founded with the name Altın Ay on 25 July 1923. Altın Ay merged with rivals Sakarya and formed İzmirspor on 28 November 1930. They are currently playing in the Turkish Regional Amateur League. The club's greatest success was achieved when they became runners-up in the former Turkish Football Championship in 1933. İzmirspor also won the İzmir Football League five times.

League participations
 Turkish Super League: 1958–67, 1968–69
 TFF First League: 1967–68, 1969–72, 1980–88, 1989–93, 1998–04
 TFF Second League: 1972–80, 1988–89, 1993–98, 2004–08
 TFF Third League: 2008–10
 Turkish Regional Amateur League: 2010–2016, 2018–
 İzmir Super Amateur League: 2016–18

Honours
 Turkish Football Championship
 Runners-up (1): 1933

 İzmir Football League
 Winners (5): 1929–30, 1932–33, 1949, 1954–55, 1955–56

References

External links
Official website
İzmirspor on TFF.org

 
Football clubs in Turkey
Association football clubs established in 1923
1923 establishments in Turkey
Süper Lig clubs
Sports teams in İzmir